Marco Grote (born 11 October 1972) is a German professional football manager and former player.

Playing career
Grote played club football for FC Bremerhaven, VfB Oldenburg and Hamburger SV II.

Managerial career
Grote was assistant manager at VfB Lübeck between 2004 and 2006, and managed various youth teams at SV Werder Bremen between 2008 and 2020.

He was appointed as manager at VfL Osnabrück in July 2020. He was sacked on 15 February 2021.

References

External links

Marco Grote (managerial career) at kicker 

1972 births
Living people
German footballers
Footballers from Bremen
Association football fullbacks
FC Bremerhaven players
VfB Oldenburg players
Hamburger SV II players
Regionalliga players
German football managers
VfB Lübeck non-playing staff
SV Werder Bremen non-playing staff
VfL Osnabrück managers
2. Bundesliga managers